Volobilis chloropterella is a moth of the family Pyralidae first described by George Hampson in 1896. It is found in Japan, Taiwan and Sri Lanka.

References

Moths of Asia
Moths described in 1896
Phycitini